Hazard controls for COVID-19 in workplaces are the application of occupational safety and health methodologies for hazard controls to the prevention of COVID-19. Vaccination is the most effective way to protect against severe illness or death from COVID-19. Multiple layers of controls are recommended, including measures such as remote work and flextime, increased ventilation, personal protective equipment (PPE) and face coverings, social distancing, and enhanced cleaning programs.

Hazard controls 
Vaccination is the most effective way to protect against severe illness or death from COVID-19. Breakthrough infections happen in only a small proportion of people who are fully vaccinated.

The U.S. Occupational Safety and Health Administration (OSHA) recommends implementing multiple layers of controls, including measures such as remote work and flextime, engineering controls (especially increased ventilation), administrative controls such as vaccination policies, personal protective equipment (PPE), face coverings, social distancing, and enhanced cleaning programs with a focus on high-touch surfaces.

Preliminary evidence suggests that the small number of fully vaccinated people who do become infected can be infectious and can spread the virus to others. The U.S. Centers for Disease Control and Prevention (CDC) recommends that fully vaccinated people can reduce their risk of becoming infected and potentially spreading it to others by:
 wearing a mask in public indoor settings in areas of substantial or high transmission;
 choosing to wear a mask regardless of level of transmission, particularly if individuals are at risk or have someone in their household who is at increased risk of severe disease or not fully vaccinated; and
 getting tested 3–5 days following a known exposure to someone with suspected or confirmed COVID-19 and wearing a mask in public indoor settings for 14 days after exposure or until a negative test result.

Along with vaccination, key controls to help protect unvaccinated and other at-risk workers include removing from the workplace all infected people, all people experiencing COVID symptoms, and any people who are not fully vaccinated who have had close contact with someone with COVID-19 and have not tested negative for COVID-19 immediately if symptoms develop and again at least 5 days after the contact (in which case they may return 7 days after contact). Fully vaccinated people who have had close contact should get tested for COVID-19 3–5 days after exposure and be required to wear face coverings for 14 days after their contact unless they test negative for COVID-19.

Additional fundamental controls that protect unvaccinated and other at-risk workers include maintaining ventilation systems, implementing physical distancing, and properly using face coverings, and proper cleaning. Fully vaccinated people in areas of substantial or high transmission should be required to wear face coverings inside as well. Employees may request reasonable accommodations, absent an undue hardship, if they are unable to comply with safety requirements due to a disability.

Randomized controlled trials and simulation studies are needed to determine the most effective types of PPE for preventing the transmission of infectious diseases to healthcare workers. There is low quality evidence that supports making improvements or modifications to personal protective equipment in order to help decrease contamination. Examples of modifications include adding tabs to masks or gloves to ease removal and designing protective gowns so that gloves are removed at the same time. In addition, there is weak evidence that the following PPE approaches or techniques may lead to reduced contamination and improved compliance with PPE protocols: Wearing double gloves, following specific doffing (removal) procedures such as those from the CDC, and providing people with spoken instructions while removing PPE.

Return to work 

As business reopen across the world, measures are being developed to re-integrate workers in a manner that minimizes risks of transmission of COVID-19. Tools and publications with approaches to be taken to help with a safe and healthy return to work have been published by several health agencies and professional organizations. Examples include tool kits with fact sheets for workers and employers, infographics, and checklists for readiness to return to work.

Employers may require workers entering the workplace to be vaccinated against the coronavirus. Federal law does not prevent companies from requiring employees to provide documentation or discriminating against employees who fail to document vaccination status. Employers can also distribute information to employees and their family members on the benefits of vaccination, as well as offer incentives to encourage employees to get vaccinated, as long as the incentives are not coercive.

Many businesses are encouraging workers to get the jab rather than requiring them to do so.

Workers' rights 
In the United States, under the General Duty Clause of the Occupational Safety and Health Act of 1970, employers are responsible for providing a safe and healthy workplace free from recognized hazards likely to cause death or serious physical harm, which includes COVID-19. In addition, OSHA's Emergency Temporary Standard applies required measures to most settings where any employee provides healthcare services or healthcare support services. Section 11(c) of the OSH prohibits employers from retaliating against workers for raising concerns about safety and health conditions, and OSHA encourages workers who suffer such retaliation to submit a complaint to OSHA's Whistleblower Protection Program within the legal time limits.

On July 15, 2020, Virginia adopted binding safety regulations on COVID-19, the first such regulations in the United States. The regulations includes mandates about control measures and prohibits retaliation against workers for expressing concern about infection risk, and provides for fines of up to US$130,000 for companies found in violation. As of July 2020, Oregon adopted a timeline that targets the establishment of COVID-19 regulations for September 1.

Historical guidance before availability of COVID-19 vaccines 
COVID-19 outbreaks have been responsible for several effects within the workplace. Workers may be absent from work due to becoming sick, needing to care for others, or from fear of possible exposure. Patterns of commerce may change, both in terms of what goods are demanded, and the means of acquiring these goods (such as shopping at off-peak hours or through delivery or drive-through services). Lastly, shipments of items from geographic areas severely affected by COVID-19 may be interrupted.

An infectious disease preparedness and response plan can be used to guide protective actions. Such plans address the levels of risk associated with various worksites and job tasks, including sources of exposure, risk factors arising from home and community settings, and risk factors of individual workers such as old age or chronic medical conditions. They also outline controls necessary to address those risks, and contingency plans for situations that may arise as a result of outbreaks. Infectious disease preparedness and response plans may be subject to national or subnational recommendations. Objectives for response to an outbreak include reducing transmission among staff, protecting people who are at higher risk for adverse health complications, maintaining business operations, and minimizing adverse effects on other entities in their supply chains. The disease severity in the community where the business is located affects the responses taken.

It has been suggested that improving ventilation and managing exposure duration can reduce transmission.

All workplaces 

In many workplaces, groups share many hours of the day indoors. These conditions can facilitate the transmission of disease, but also control it through workplace practices and policies. Identifying industries or particular jobs that have the highest potential exposure to a specific risk can help in the development of interventions to control or prevent the spread of diseases such as COVID-19.

According to the U.S. Occupational Safety and Health Administration (OSHA), lower exposure risk jobs have minimal occupational contact with the public and other coworkers. Basic infection prevention measures recommended for all workplaces include frequent and thorough hand washing, encouraging workers to use sick leave if they are sick, respiratory etiquette including covering coughs and sneezes, providing tissues and trash receptacles, preparing for remote work or shift work if needed, discouraging workers from using others' tools and equipment, and maintaining routine cleaning and disinfecting of the work environment. Prompt identification and isolation of potentially infectious individuals is a critical step in protecting workers, customers, visitors, and others at a worksite. The U.S. Centers for Disease Control and Prevention (CDC) recommends that employees who have symptoms of acute respiratory illness are to stay home until they are free of fever, signs of a fever, and any other symptoms, and that sick leave policies are flexible, permit employees to stay home to care for a sick family member, and that employees are aware of these policies.

There are also psychosocial hazards arising from anxiety or stress from worries about contracting COVID-19, the illness or death of a relative or friend, changes in work patterns, and financial or interpersonal difficulties arising from the pandemic. Social distancing measures may prevent typical coping mechanisms such as personal space or sharing problems with others. Controls for these hazards include managers checking on workers to ask how they are, facilitating worker interactions, and formal services for employee assistance, coaching, or occupational health.

It has been suggested that improving ventilation and managing exposure duration can reduce transmission.

Medium-risk workplaces 
According to OSHA, medium exposure risk jobs include those that require frequent or close contact within  of people who are not known or suspected COVID-19 patients, but may be infected with SARS-CoV-2 due to ongoing community transmission around the business location, or because the individual has recent international travel to a location with widespread COVID-19 transmission. These include workers who have contact with the general public such as in schools, high-population-density work environments, and some high-volume retail settings.

Engineering controls for this and higher risk groups include installing high-efficiency air filters, increasing ventilation rates, installing physical barriers such as clear plastic sneeze guards, and installing a drive-through window for customer service.

Administrative controls for this and higher risk groups include encouraging sick workers to stay at home, replacing face-to-face meetings with virtual communications, establishing staggered shifts, discontinuing nonessential travel to locations with ongoing COVID-19 outbreaks, developing emergency communications plans including a forum for answering workers’ concerns, providing workers with up-to-date education and training on COVID-19 risk factors and protective behaviors, training workers who need to use protecting clothing and equipment how to use it, providing resources and a work environment that promotes personal hygiene, requiring regular hand washing, limiting customers' and the public's access to the worksite, and posting signage about hand washing and other COVID-19 protective measures.

Depending on the work task, workers with at least medium exposure risk may need to wear personal protective equipment including some combination of gloves, a gown, a face shield or face mask, or goggles. Workers in this risk group rarely require use of respirators.

For retail workers in food and grocery businesses, CDC and OSHA recommend encouraging touchless payment options and minimizing handling of cash and credit cards, placing cash on the counter rather than passing it directly by hand, and routinely disinfecting frequently touched surfaces such as workstations, cash registers, payment terminals, door handles, tables, and countertops. Employers may place sneeze guards with a pass-through opening at the bottom of the barrier in checkout and customer service locations, use every other check-out lane, move the electronic payment terminal farther from the cashier, place visual cues such as floor decals to indicate where customers should stand during check out, provide remote shopping alternatives, and limit the maximum customer capacity at the door.

Meat and poultry processing facilities have work environments that may contribute substantially to their potential exposures, as they often work close to one another on assembly lines during prolonged work shifts. For engineering controls, CDC and OSHA recommend configuring communal work environments so that workers are spaced at least six feet apart including along processing lines, using physical barriers such as strip curtains or plexiglass to separate workers from each other, and ensuring adequate ventilation that minimizes air from fans blowing from one worker directly at another worker. For administrative controls, they recommend staggering workers' arrival, break, and departure times, cohorting workers so they are always assigned to the same shifts with the same coworkers, encouraging single-file movement through the facility, avoiding carpooling to and from work, and considering a program of screening workers before entry into the workplace and setting criteria for return to work of recovered workers and for exclusion of sick workers. For personal protective equipment, they recommend face shields and considering allowing voluntary use of filtering facepiece respirators such as N95 masks. They also recommend wearing cloth face masks that should be replaced if they become wet, soiled, or otherwise visibly contaminated during the work shift, although cloth face masks are not considered to be personal protective equipment.

If a person becomes sick on an airplane, proper controls to protect workers and other passengers include separating the sick person from others by a distance of 6 feet, designating one crew member to serve the sick person, and offering a face mask to the sick person or asking the sick person to cover their mouth and nose with tissues when coughing or sneezing. Cabin crew should wear disposable medical gloves when tending to a sick traveler or touching body fluids or potentially contaminated surfaces, and possibly additional personal protective equipment if the sick traveler has fever, persistent cough, or difficulty breathing. Gloves and other disposable items should be disposed of in a biohazard bag, and contaminated surfaces should be cleaned and disinfected afterwards.

For commercial shipping, including cruise ships and other passenger vessels, hazard controls include postponing travel when sick, and self-isolating and informing the onboard medical center immediately if one develops a fever or other symptoms while on board. Ideally, medical follow-up should occur in the isolated person's cabin.

For schools and childcare facilities, CDC recommends short-term closure to clean or disinfect if an infected person has been in a school building regardless of community spread. When there is minimal to moderate community transmission, social distancing strategies can be implemented such as canceling field trips, assemblies, and other large gatherings such as physical education or choir classes or meals in a cafeteria, increasing the space between desks, staggering arrival and dismissal times, limiting nonessential visitors, and using a separate health office location for children with flu-like symptoms. When there is substantial transmission in the local community, in addition to social distancing strategies, extended school dismissals may be considered.

For law enforcement personnel performing daily routine activities, the immediate health risk is considered low by CDC. Law enforcement officials who must make contact with individuals confirmed or suspected to have COVID-19 are recommended to follow the same guidelines as emergency medical technicians, including proper personal protective equipment. If close contact occurs during apprehension, workers should clean and disinfect their duty belt and gear prior to reuse using a household cleaning spray or wipe, and follow standard operating procedures for the containment and disposal of used PPE and for containing and laundering clothes.

High-risk healthcare and mortuary workplaces 

OSHA considers certain healthcare and mortuary workers to be at high or very high categories of exposure risk. High exposure risk jobs include healthcare delivery, support, laboratory, and medical transport workers who are exposed to known or suspected COVID-19 patients. These become very high exposure risk if workers perform aerosol-generating procedures on, or collect or handle specimens from, known or suspected COVID-19 patients. Aerosol-generating procedures include intubation, cough induction procedures, bronchoscopies, some dental procedures and exams, or invasive specimen collection. High exposure risk mortuary jobs include workers involved in preparing the bodies of people who had known or suspected cases of COVID-19 at the time of their death; these become very high exposure risk if they perform an autopsy.

Additional engineering controls for these risk groups include isolation rooms for patients with known or suspected COVID-19, including when aerosol-generating procedures are performed. Specialized negative pressure ventilation may be appropriate in some healthcare and mortuary settings. Specimens should be handled with Biosafety level 3 precautions. The World Health Organization (WHO) recommends that incoming patients be separated into distinct waiting areas depending on whether they are a suspected COVID-19 case.

In addition to other PPE, OSHA recommends respirators for those who work within 6 feet of patients known to be, or suspected of being, infected with SARS-CoV-2, and those performing aerosol-generating procedures. In the United States, NIOSH-approved N95 filtering facepiece respirators or better must be used in the context of a comprehensive, written respiratory protection program that includes fit-testing, training, and medical exams. Other types of respirators can provide greater protection and improve worker comfort.

The WHO does not recommend coveralls, as COVID-19 is a respiratory disease rather than being transmitted through bodily fluids. WHO recommends only a surgical mask for point-of-entry screening personnel. For those who are collecting respiratory specimens from, caring for, or transporting COVID-19 patients without any aerosol-generating procedures, WHO recommends a surgical mask, goggles, or face shield, gown, and gloves. If an aerosol-generating procedure is performed, the surgical mask is replaced with an N95 or FFP2 respirator. Given that the global supply of PPE is insufficient, WHO recommends minimizing the need for PPE through telemedicine, physical barriers such as clear windows, allowing only those involved in direct care to enter a room with a COVID-19 patient, using only the PPE necessary for the specific task, continuing use of the same respirator without removing it while caring for multiple patients with the same diagnosis, monitoring and coordinating the PPE supply chain, and discouraging the use of masks for asymptomatic individuals.

See also

 Biological hazard
 Hierarchy of hazard controls
 Pandemic

References

External links 
 Listing of international guidance from EU-OSHA
 List N: Disinfectants for Use Against SARS-CoV-2 (COVID-19) (United States Environmental Protection Agency)
 24th Collegium Ramazzini statement. Prevention of work-related infection in the COVID-19 pandemic May 2020.
 European Agency for Safety and Health at Work, Healthy workplaces. Stop the pandemic campaign materials
 European Agency for Safety and Health at Work, COVID-19: guidance for the workplace
 European Agency for Safety and Health at Work, Back to the workplace: Adapting workplaces and protecting workers
 Office for National Statistics, UK, Which occupations have the highest potential exposure to the coronavirus (COVID-19)?
 CDC/NIOSH guidance
 U.S. National Institute for Occupational Safety and Health website on COVID-19
 U.S. Centers for Disease Control and Prevention, Resuming Business Toolkit.
 U.S. Centers for Disease Control and Prevention, Toolkit for Worker Safety & Support
 Fact Sheet for Food and grocery pick-up and delivery drivers, Centers for Disease Control and Prevention.
 Fact Sheet for nail salon employers and employees on measures to protect against COVID-19 while at work.
 Fact Sheet for Firefighters and EMS Providers, Centers for Disease Control and Prevention.
 Fact Sheet for Grocery and food retail workers, Centers for Disease Control and Prevention.
 Fact Sheet for Mail and Parcel delivery drivers, Centers for Disease Control and Prevention.
 Fact Sheet for Rideshare and ride-for-hire drivers, Centers for Disease Control and Prevention.
 Resources related to Coronavirus Disease 2019 (COVID-19) and Mining, Centers for Disease Control and Prevention.
 Guidance for Healthcare settings, Centers for Disease Control and Prevention.
 U.S. Occupational Safety and Health Administration website on COVID-19
 American Industrial Hygiene Association website on COVID-19
 The Synergist, American Industrial Hygiene Association, COVID-19 and the Industrial Hygienist
 European Agency for Safety and Health at Work website on COVID-19
 UK Health Executive COVID-19 guidance for employees, employers, and businesses
 Canadian Centre for Occupational Safety and Health COVID-19 fact sheet
 COVID-19 Health Screen Questions

Occupational hazards
Responses to the COVID-19 pandemic
Occupational safety and health